This is list of notable software packages that implement engineering analysis of structure against applied loads using structural engineering and structural engineering theory.

References

 Top 5 Structural Design and Analysis Software That Get the Work Done!, February 2016
 Structure Magazine, Software Guide, August 2014
 Autodesk Completes Acquisition of Robobat, 1/15/2008
 Industry Canada, 2014-03-19

Structural engineering
Civil engineering
Lists of software